Leckie and Leckie is an educational publishing firm based in Glasgow, Scotland. The main focus of the company is educational books for students taking Scottish Qualifications Authority (SQA) courses. They offer books on most Standard Grade, Intermediate 1, Intermediate 2, National 5, Higher and Advanced Higher courses.

External links
 Leckie and Leckie website

Book publishing companies of Scotland
Educational publishing companies
Educational organisations based in Scotland